Paris By Night 38: In Toronto is a Paris By Night program produced by Thúy Nga that was filmed at the Canadian Broadcasting Centre Studio #40 in Toronto, Canada. The MC's were Nguyễn Ngọc Ngạn and Nguyễn Cao Kỳ Duyên. This show was released on VHS in 1996. This was the first Paris By Night production to be filmed outside France and the United States.

Track listing

Notes
 Rights to the songs "Nụ hôn khó quên", "Dấu chân tình ái", "Riêng một góc trời", and "Quê hương và mẹ hiền" belonged to Thúy Nga Productions from the time of release.

Paris by Night

vi:Paris By Night 38